"Inevitable" is a Latin rock song co-written and performed by Colombian-born singer Shakira, released as the fourth single from her 1998 multi-platinum album Dónde Están los Ladrones?.

Music video
In the video for "Inevitable", Shakira is singing the song to an audience in a circular stage. The video starts out with candlelights coming from the audience. As the song progresses, strobe lights shine on Shakira and her band as she shakes her head. Toward the end of the video, bubbles and confetti fall from above, the song slows to almost an a cappella, and the video exits with Shakira holding her microphone over her head.

Scenes from the video were also re-edited for a Pepsi commercial that aired throughout Latin America in 1999. In the commercial, a man opens a Pepsi can which the stage (edited to have the Pepsi logo) is inside of, and the audience hold Pepsi cans which burst open to the rhythm of the song. At the end, the man smiles, and Shakira holds a Pepsi can while saying the Spanish version of the slogan, "pide más".

English version
In addition, an English version was also penned, which then was planned for an English version of ¿Dónde Están los Ladrones?. It is titled "Inevitable (English)", which has been performed at some United States shows such as The Rosie O'Donnell Show and The ALMA Awards, the latter being performed with Melissa Etheridge. However, plans were soon scrapped, and Shakira released Laundry Service instead.

Live performances
There has been a noticeable change in her singing version of the song in recent performances, predominantly during the Oral Fixation Tour. Instead of caterwauling after the 2nd chorus as recorded, she holds the note of "inevitable". She has made this change since her 1999 MTV Unplugged performance. Also, during her 2010-11 The Sun Comes Out World Tour, she changed the lyrics from "y no entiendo de futbol" ("I don't understand football") to "y ahora entiendo de futbol" ("now I understand football"),, making reference to her relationship with footballer Gerard Piqué.

Formats and track listings
Mexican CD single
 "Inevitable" (Soft Final Ballad)3:06
 "Inevitable" (Space Vocal Soft Final Ballad)3:07
 "Inevitable" (Final Heavy Mix)3:08
 "Inevitable" (Final Extended Heavy Mix)6:53
 "Inevitable" (Final Smokin Dub Mix)7:49
 "Inevitable" (Final Ambient Mix)7:15

Charts

Weekly charts

Year-end charts

References

1999 singles
Shakira songs
Spanish-language songs
Songs written by Shakira
Rock ballads
Songs written by Luis Fernando Ochoa
Sony Music Latin singles
1998 songs
1990s ballads